My Love, My Bride is a 2014 South Korean romantic comedy film starring Jo Jung-suk and Shin Min-ah.

It is a remake of the hit 1990 film of the same title starring Park Joong-hoon and Choi Jin-sil.

Plot
The film revolves around the real life circumstances of every newlywed sweethearts. Young-min and Mi-young are a young couple who get married after graduating from college. Following the honeymoon period, they begin to bicker with each other. As they struggle to make their marriage work, Young-min and Mi-young gradually understand what love really is.

Cast
Jo Jung-suk as Young-min
Shin Min-ah as Mi-young
Yoon Jung-hee as Seung-hee
Bae Seong-woo as Dal-soo
Ra Mi-ran as Madam
Jeon Moo-song as Pan Hae-il
Lee Si-eon as Ki-tae 
Ko Kyu-pil as Jeong-jin
Seo Kang-joon as Joon-soo 
Hwang Jeong-min 
Seo Shin-ae as Jae-kyung
Yoo Ha-joon as Choi Seong-woo
Kwon Hyuk-soo as pork restaurant deliver guy

Box office
My Love, My Bride was released on October 8, 2014. It drew 787,535 admissions after five days in theaters, making it the first romantic comedy to rank number one at the South Korean box office for 2014. The film topped the box office for two consecutive weeks, earning  from 1.44 million admissions. It reached 2 million admissions on its fourth week.

Awards and nominations

References

External links
 

South Korean romantic comedy films
Remakes of South Korean films
2014 romantic comedy films
Films about poets
2010s South Korean films
2010s Korean-language films